Golden Rooster Award for Best Director (中国电影金鸡奖最佳导演) is the main category of Competition of Golden Rooster Awards, awarding to director who have outstanding achievement in direction for motion pictures.

Award winners and nominees

1990s

2000s

2010s

2020s

References

Golden Rooster, Best Director
Director Best
Awards for best director